Apteraliplus is a genus of crawling water beetles in the family Haliplidae. There is at least one described species in Apteraliplus, A. parvulus (Roberts, 1913), the flightless haliplid beetle.

References

Further reading

 
 
 
 

Haliplidae
Monotypic Adephaga genera